Scopula hyphenophora is a moth of the  family Geometridae. It is found in India, Peninsular Malaysia and on Borneo and Bali. The habitat consists of lowland primary and secondary forests, alluvial forests and forests on limestone.

Subspecies
Scopula hyphenophora hyphenophora (north-eastern Himalaya)
Scopula hyphenophora ambiguiceps Prout, 1938 (Peninsular Malaysia, Borneo, Bali)

References

Moths described in 1896
hyphenophora
Moths of Asia